Pier-Sante Cicala (14 February 1664–29 December 1727) was an Italian painter of the Baroque period, born and active in Ascoli Piceno. After dallying with priesthood, he became a painter, manuscript illuminator, and architect. He trained in the former with Ludovico Trasi. He learned military architectural designs from Captain Celso Saccoccia. He painted both sacred subjects and still lifes.

References

1644 births
1727 deaths
People from Ascoli Piceno
17th-century Italian painters
Italian male painters
18th-century Italian painters
Italian Baroque painters
18th-century Italian male artists